The Eber Sherman Farm is a historic farmstead located at 1010 State Road in North Adams, Massachusetts.  Built about 1843, it is a well-preserved example of a local variant of transitional Greek Revival and Italianate architecture.  It was listed on the National Register of Historic Places in 1983.

Description and history
The Eber Sherman Farm is located on the south side of State Road (Massachusetts Route 2) in western North Adams, near the town line with Williamstown.  The main house is a -story wood-frame structure, with a gabled roof, two interior brick chimneys, and a clapboarded exterior.  It has a five-bay main facade, with a center entrance flanked by sidelight windows and topped by a transom window.  The entry is sheltered by a flat-roof portico with a bracketed frieze supported by fluted columns.  The building corners feature wide pilasters, and the roof eave is studded by regularly spaced decorative brackets.  A single-story addition extends to the left side, with a porch across its front.

It lay in a part of Williamstown that was transferred to North Adams as part of a municipal boundary adjustment in 1900. Eber Sherman ran a dairy operation on the farm, and his son sold the property in 1862, after which it went through a succession of owners.

See also
 National Register of Historic Places listings in Berkshire County, Massachusetts

References

External links

Houses completed in 1843
Buildings and structures in North Adams, Massachusetts
Farms on the National Register of Historic Places in Massachusetts
National Register of Historic Places in Berkshire County, Massachusetts
1843 establishments in Massachusetts